The first Cabinet of Singapore, was led by Lee Kuan Yew, who was elected as prime minister. It was formed on 5 June 1959, after securing a landslide victory in the 1959 general election.

A minor cabinet reshuffle was made on 24 September 1961.

List of Ministers

References 

Executive branch of the government of Singapore
Lists of political office-holders in Singapore
Cabinets established in 1959
Cabinets disestablished in 1963
Lee Kuan Yew